Volotsky is a rural locality (a khutor) Chernyshkovskoye Urban Settlement, Chernyshkovsky District, Volgograd Oblast, Russia. The population was 521 as of 2010. There are 5 streets.

Geography 
Volotsky is located 8 km southwest of Chernyshkovsky (the district's administrative centre) by road. Chernyshkovsky is the nearest rural locality.

References 

Rural localities in Chernyshkovsky District